The "Five stars rising in the East" armband is an Eastern Han (25–220 AD) to Western Jin (265–316 AD) era Sichuan brocade armband embroidered with the phrase "", meaning "simultaneous appearance of five stars in the eastern sky is a propitious sign for the 'Middle Kingdom'", or "Five stars rising in the East, being a propitious sign for the Middle Kingdom".  Another cloth of the same pattern was found later and has the words "put down South Qiang" (討南羌). In 2002, they were designated one of the cultural relics forbidden to be exhibited abroad.

Discovery
The pieces were unearthed in October 1995 at the Niya ruins in Xinjiang by an archaeological team made up of Chinese and Japanese scholars. It was found near the elbow/waist area of a corpse in a rich tomb.

Interpretation
The phrase "Five stars rising in the East, being a propitious sign for the Middle Kingdom" resembles a similar phrase found in the Records of the Grand Historian'''s scroll 27. In the ancient times the five stars were represented as Chenxing, Taibai, Yinghuo, Suixing and Zhenxing. In modern times these are Mercury, Venus, Mars, Jupiter, Saturn, respectively. These are also represented by "Five Elements" with water, metal, earth, fire, wood.  Researchers from the Japanese observatory said the next alignment of the five stars to the east will not be until March 21, 2022.

The phrase "put down South Qiang" refers to the area that was first mentioned in a sentence in the Western Han Essentials'''s scroll 46 in relation to the four ancient commandery.  The four are located in today's Dunhuang, Jiuquan, Zhangye and Wuwei, in the northwestern province of Gansu, respectively.

When the two pieces are combined, it forms the phrase "Five stars rising in the East, being a propitious sign for the Middle Kingdom to put down South Qiang" (五星出東方利中國討南羌), though the meaning is up for debate.

References

Archaeological artifacts of China
1995 archaeological discoveries
Hotan
History of Xinjiang
Culture in Sichuan